Laurel County Public Schools is a school district headquartered in London, Kentucky. It is one of two districts serving Laurel County, and is the only one of the two to operate high schools.

The district was established in 1840.

The Superintendent for the school district is Doug Bennett (Ed.D.)

Elected board members are Ed Jones, Jeff Lewis, Charles “Bud” Stuber, John Begley, and Philip Bundy, DVM

Schools
 High schools
 North Laurel High School
 South Laurel High School
 Laurel County Center for Innovation

 Middle schools
 North Laurel Middle School
 South Laurel Middle School

 Primary schools
 Bush Elementary School
 Camp Ground Elementary School
 Cold Hill Elementary School
 Colony Elementary School
 Hazel Green Elementary School
 Hunter Hills Elementary School
 Johnson Elementary School
 Keavy Elementary School
 London Elementary School
 Sublimity Elementary School
 Wyan-Pine Elementary School

 Alternative schools
 Laurel County Day Treatment
 McDaniel Learning Center

See also
 East Bernstadt Independent School District - The other school district in the county, which serves only K–8 students.

References

External links
 Laurel County Public Schools

School districts in Kentucky
Education in Laurel County, Kentucky
1840 establishments in Kentucky
Educational institutions established in 1840